Southern Cross Transit is an Australian operator of school bus and charter services in the western suburbs of Brisbane and Ipswich in South East Queensland.

History
Southern Cross Transit was formed in 1980 by former Lowe's Bus Service, Sydney proprietor Wally Horwood. It built up a network of school buses in the western suburbs of Brisbane and Ipswich.

In August 2002, Southern Cross Transit was purchased by the Oliveri family, proprietors of Interline Bus Services, Sydney. In August 2008, Southern Cross commenced operating a service between Ipswich and Indoorpilly. This ceased in June 2009.

Fleet
As at October 2014, the fleet consisted of 25 buses and coaches.

Depots
Southern Cross Transit operates out of depot in Karana Downs.

See also

Bus transport in Queensland

References

Bus companies of Queensland
Public transport in Brisbane
Translink (Queensland)
1980 establishments in Australia
Transport companies established in 1980